San Miguel Arcángel Fountain may refer to:

 San Miguel Arcángel Fountain (Cholula)
 San Miguel Arcángel Fountain (Puebla)